The Italian general election of 2018 took place on 4 March 2018.

In Veneto the centre-right coalition (48.1%), dominated by the Lega (Liga Veneta), obtained a resounding victory, being largely ahead of the Five Star Movement (24.4%) and the centre-left coalition (20.3%). The Lega (32.2%) was largely the largest party, followed by the Five Star Movement (24.4%), the Democratic Party (16.7%) and Forza Italia (10.6%). Under the new electoral system, which re-introduced single-seat constituencies, the centre-right won all such constituencies.

Results
Chamber of Deputies

Senate

Elections in Veneto
2018 elections in Italy
March 2018 events in Italy